People Finder, PeopleFinder or PeopleFinders may refer to:

 Google Person Finder, web application from Google
 Katrina PeopleFinder, an online project setup in the aftermath of Hurricane Katrina
 peopleFinders.com, an American public records company

See also
 Missing person
 People Finder Interchange Format (PFIF)